San Geronimo (Spanish: San Gerónimo, meaning "St. Jerome") is a census-designated place (CDP) located in the San Geronimo Valley in Marin County, California in the United States. San Geronimo is bordered by Lagunitas-Forest Knolls to its west and Woodacre to its east. The population was 510 at the 2020 census.

History
The first known map to depict the San Geronimo Valley was published in 1834. Prior to 1877, the place was called Nicasio. The San Geronimo post office opened in 1895, closed in 1910, and re-opened in 1911.

Geography

San Geronimo was once the home of the San Geronimo Golf Course. In 2018, The Trust for Public Land purchased the  site and has opened it to public access as a park while it works to restore habitat and conduct a planning process for future use.

Demographics

2010
At the 2010 census San Geronimo had a population of 446. The racial makeup of San Geronimo was 421 (94.4%) White, 3 (0.7%) African American, 2 (0.4%) Native American, 3 (0.7%) Asian, 3 (0.7%) from other races, and 14 (3.1%) from two or more races. Hispanic or Latino of any race were 21 people (4.7%).

The census reported that 100% of the population lived in households.

There were 199 households, 49 (24.6%) had children under the age of 18 living in them, 108 (54.3%) were opposite-sex married couples living together, 19 (9.5%) had a female householder with no husband present, 7 (3.5%) had a male householder with no wife present.  There were 13 (6.5%) unmarried opposite-sex partnerships, and 2 (1.0%) same-sex married couples or partnerships. 43 households (21.6%) were one person and 9 (4.5%) had someone living alone who was 65 or older. The average household size was 2.24.  There were 134 families (67.3% of households); the average family size was 2.60.

The age distribution was 72 people (16.1%) under the age of 18, 20 people (4.5%) aged 18 to 24, 89 people (20.0%) aged 25 to 44, 189 people (42.4%) aged 45 to 64, and 76 people (17.0%) who were 65 or older.  The median age was 50.0 years. For every 100 females there were 97.3 males.  For every 100 females age 18 and over, there were 94.8 males.

The homeowner vacancy rate was 0%; the rental vacancy rate was 0%. 76.5% of the population lived in owner-occupied housing units and 23.5% lived in rental housing units.

2000
At the 2000 census there were 436 people, 174 households, and 120 families in the CDP. The racial makeup of the CDP in 2010 was 90.6% non-Hispanic White, 0.7% non-Hispanic African American, 0.4% Native American, 0.7% Asian, 0.4% from other races, and 2.5% from two or more races. Hispanic or Latino of any race were 4.7%.

Of the 174 households 28.7% had children under the age of 18 living with them, 51.1% were married couples living together, 14.9% had a female householder with no husband present, and 31.0% were non-families. 18.4% of households were one person and 2.9% were one person aged 65 or older.  The average household size was 2.47 and the average family size was 2.70.

The age distribution was 17.9% under the age of 18, 6.9% from 18 to 24, 26.8% from 25 to 44, 39.4% from 45 to 64, and 8.9% 65 or older.  The median age was 44 years. For every 100 females there were 92.9 males.  For every 100 females age 18 and over, there were 96.7 males.

The median household income was $58,542 and the median family income  was $60,875. Males had a median income of $70,536 versus $32,292 for females. The per capita income for the CDP was $31,960.  About 9.9% of families and 10.4% of the population were below the poverty line, including 18.4% of those under age 18 and none of those age 65 or over.

References

Census-designated places in Marin County, California
West Marin